The ZB-60 was a heavy machine gun designed by Zbrojovka Brno in Czechoslovakia during the 1930s. Weapons acquired after the German occupation of Czechoslovakia in March 1939 were taken into Wehrmacht service as the 15 mm FlaMG 39(t); Former Yugoslav guns were designated as the 15 mm FlaMG 490(j). The Germans used them as light anti-aircraft guns during World War II. The British developed their 15 mm Besa Mk I from the ZB-60 for service on armored fighting vehicles.

See also 
 Weapons of Czechoslovakia interwar period

Bibliography 
 Gander, Terry and Chamberlain, Peter. Weapons of the Third Reich: An Encyclopedic Survey of All Small Arms, Artillery and Special Weapons of the German Land Forces 1939-1945. New York: Doubleday, 1979 
 Kliment, Charles K. and Nakládal, Bretislav. Germany's First Ally: Armed Forces of the Slovak State 1939-1945. Atglen, PA: Schiffer, 1997

External links

Machine guns of Czechoslovakia
Heavy machine guns
Military equipment introduced in the 1930s